Muditha Fernando (born 9 September 1980) is a Sri Lankan former cricketer. He played in 62 first-class and 36 List A matches between 2000/01 and 2014/15. He made his Twenty20 debut on 17 August 2004, for Kurunegala Youth Cricket Club in the 2004 SLC Twenty20 Tournament.

References

External links
 

1980 births
Living people
Sri Lankan cricketers
Burgher Recreation Club cricketers
Kurunegala Youth Cricket Club cricketers
Saracens Sports Club cricketers
Sinhalese Sports Club cricketers
Tamil Union Cricket and Athletic Club cricketers
Place of birth missing (living people)